Lauren Jeska (born 5 September 1974) is a British former fell runner from Lancaster. Jeska, a trans woman, was convicted of the attempted murder of Ralph Knibbs, HR manager for UK Athletics after Knibbs investigated Jeska's eligibility to compete as a woman.

Early life 
Jeska was born to parents Pauline and Graham Jameson. Graham Jameson is a mathematician at Lancaster University and both parents are active in Lancaster Baptist Church. She had two younger twin brothers, one of whom had mental health issues and took his own life.

Jeska went to Lancaster Royal Grammar School, running on the cross-country team. She went on to Oxford University, where she studied physics, gaining a first. Jeska began studying for a doctorate there but dropped out of the course. She later attended Leeds University, gaining a master's in 2006 in Gender, Sexuality and Queer Theory.

Transitioning and fell-running
During Easter of 1998 Jeska came out to her parents as a trans woman, and had a gonadectomy in 2000. While at Leeds, she took up fell-running, finding immediate success, winning the Blackshaw Head fell race in 2008. She later joined Todmorden Harriers athletics club, and went on to win the 2010 Three Shires Fell Race, the 2011 Liverpool Half Marathon, the 2010, 2011, and 2012 English, and 2012 British Fell Running Championships. After moving to Wales she joined Aberystwyth Athletics Club.

Attempted murder
In June 2015, UK Athletics told Jeska that she would be required to provide blood tests to prove that her hormone levels were within normal female range, as there was no documentation for Jeska's 2000 castration. Jeska took exception as she felt it would reveal her transgender status publicly. She failed to provide the samples required.

In March 2016 she attacked Ralph Knibbs, a former professional rugby player and UK Athletics HR manager, with a knife, at Alexander Stadium, in Birmingham. Jeska stabbed Knibbs in the head and neck, resulting in a 2 cm hole with blood pumping out. She claimed she feared UK Athletics would strip her of her records and her eligibility to compete against female athletes. Jeska also attacked Tim Begley and Kevan Taylor, employees of UKA who came to Knibbs's aid.

In September 2016, she pleaded guilty to attempted murder, plus two counts of assault occasioning actual bodily harm on Begley and Taylor, and weapons charges for knife possession.

On 15 November 2016, she was scheduled to be detained in hospital under the Mental Health Act 1983, but the hearing was adjourned for a month pending further psychiatric reports. Jeska was found during these investigations to have autism.

In March 2017, Jeska was jailed for 18 years for the crimes, which severed nerves in Knibbs's body, leaving him with restricted movement, difficulty eating, and limited vision in both eyes. 

Jeska is currently serving her sentence at HM Prison Foston Hall in Derbyshire. Her racing results were declared null and void.

See also
Transgender people in sports

References

1974 births
Living people
English female long-distance runners
English female criminals
British fell runners
British female criminals
English LGBT sportspeople
Transgender sportspeople
Transgender women
LGBT track and field athletes
21st-century English criminals
English people convicted of assault
Alumni of the University of Oxford
People from Lancaster, Lancashire
People educated at Lancaster Royal Grammar School
Alumni of the University of Leeds
British people convicted of attempted murder
Prisoners and detainees of England and Wales
Sportspeople with autism